Nabalus altissimus (formerly Prenanthes altissima), commonly called the tall rattlesnakeroot or white lettuce, is a species of plant in the family Asteraceae. In 2010 it was reclassified from the genus Prenanthes to Nabalus.

Habitat
This perennial grows in mesic environments including riparian zones and blooms in late summer and autumn.

Range
This species occurs in the eastern United States west to Michigan, Missouri, and Texas as well as in Quebec, Canada but is unknown in Alabama, Mississippi, and Florida. In Texas, it occurs in Jasper and Newton counties in the extreme southeastern part of the state.

References

Cichorieae
Flora of the Eastern United States
Flora of the Appalachian Mountains
Taxa named by Augustin Pyramus de Candolle
Taxa named by André Michaux